The 1945 Balochistan earthquake occurred in British India at 1:26 PKT on 28 November 1945 with a moment magnitude of 8.1 and a maximum perceived intensity of X (Extreme) on the Mercalli intensity scale.

Earthquake

The earthquake's epicenter was 97.6 kilometers south-southwest of Pasni in Balochistan and a tsunami caused damage along the Makran coastal region. Deaths from the event were reported to be at least 300 and as many as 4,000 people.

Another very large earthquake (7.3 ) occurred in nearly the same location on August 5, 1947, but not much is known about the event or its effects.

See also
 List of earthquakes in 1945
 List of earthquakes in Pakistan

References

Sources

Further reading

External links
Earthquake and Tsunami of 28 November 1945 in Southern Pakistan – George Pararas-Carayannis
Search for Eyewitness Accounts and Historical Documents on 1945 Makran Tsunami – UNESCO

1945 Balochistan
1945 Balochistan
History of Balochistan
Balochistan 1945
Balochistan
November 1945 events in Asia
1945 in British India
1945 disasters in Asia